Turkey has a unitary structure in terms of administration and this aspect is one of the most important factors shaping the Turkish public administration. When three powers (executive, legislative and judiciary) are taken into account as the main functions of the state, local administrations have little power. Turkey is a highly centralized unitary system, and the provinces are subordinated to the centre. Local administrations were established to provide services in place and the government is represented by the governors and city governors. Besides the governors and the city governors, other senior public officials are also appointed by the central government rather than appointed by mayors or elected by constituents.

Within this unitary framework, Turkey is subdivided into 81 provinces for administrative purposes. Each province is divided into districts, for a total of 973 districts. Turkey is also subdivided into 7 regions and 21 subregions for geographic, demographic and economic purposes; this does not refer to an administrative division.

The largely centralized structure of decision-making in Ankara is often considered an impediment to good governance, and causes resentment in particular in ethnic minority regions. Steps towards decentralization since 2004 have proved to be a highly controversial topic in Turkey. Turkey is obligated under the European Charter of Local Self-Government to decentralize its administrative structure. A decentralization program for Turkey is an ongoing discussion in the country's academics, politics and the broader public.

Turkey is subdivided in a hierarchical manner to subdivisions;
Provinces 
Districts 
Belde (semi-rural)
Villages (rural)
Neighbourhoods (urban)

Provinces

Districts

Towns

Villages

Neighbourhoods

See also
 Regions of Turkey
 Provinces of Turkey
 Districts of Turkey
 Towns of Turkey
 Villages of Turkey
 Neighbourhoods of Turkey
 List of municipalities in Turkey
 List of largest cities and towns in Turkey
 Metropolitan centers in Turkey
 Anatolian Tigers
 List of twin towns and sister cities in Turkey
 ISO 3166-2 codes of Turkey
 FIPS region codes of Turkey (standard withdrawn in 2008)
 NUTS of Turkey

References

 
Turkey
Turkey
Lists of subdivisions of Turkey
Turkey